John E. Tucker (April 15, 1901 – February 20, 1983) was an American football player and coach. He served as the head coach at Arkansas Tech University from 1933 to 1947, compiling a record of 77–17–9. He played football at Arkansas Tech and later at the University of Alabama in 1930 and 1931.

Arkansas Tech
Tucker is ultimately responsible for the idiosyncratic nickname "Wonder Boys" for Arkansas Tech University. On November 15, 1919, Tucker, as a 17-year-old freshman, scored two touchdowns and kicked two extra points to lead the Second District Agricultural School Aggies to a 14–0 upset win over Jonesboro. In newspaper accounts following the game, Tucker and his teammates were referred to as "Wonder Boys," and the nickname remains to this day. Tucker was labeled as "The Original Wonder Boy" and was associated with the school for the rest of his life. He went on to play on the University of Alabama's Rose Bowl team in 1931 and served Arkansas Tech in a variety of roles - including coach, athletic director and chemistry professor - between 1925 and 1972. Two buildings on the Tech campus - Tucker Coliseum and Tucker Hall - are named in his honor.

Alabama
Tucker played for Wallace Wade's Alabama Crimson Tide football teams of 1930 and 1931, winning a national championship in 1930.

Head coaching record

References

External links
 

1901 births
1983 deaths
American football quarterbacks
Alabama Crimson Tide football players
Arkansas Tech Wonder Boys and Golden Suns athletic directors
Arkansas Tech Wonder Boys football coaches
Arkansas Tech Wonder Boys football players
People from Pope County, Arkansas
People from Russellville, Arkansas